Siarhei Piatrovich Liakhovich (also Siarhiej Piatrovič Liachovič or Siarhiej Piatrovič Lyakhóvich; born 29 May 1976) is a Belarusian professional boxer who held the WBO heavyweight title in 2006. As an amateur he won a bronze medal in the super-heavyweight division at the 1997 World Championships.

Amateur career
Liakhovich was born in Vitebsk, in the former Byelorussian Soviet Socialist Republic (now Belarus), and represented Belarus at the 1996 Olympic Games.  He was a long-time amateur who won a bronze medal at the 1997 World Championships. He amassed a 145–15 record before turning pro in 1998.

Professional career

His first defeat occurred on June 1, 2002, when he was knocked out by Maurice Harris in the 9th round.

Liakhovich won the WBO title from  Lamon Brewster on April 1, 2006. Liakhovich was knocked down in the 7th round, but went on to win on points via unanimous decision. He lost the title to Shannon Briggs by technical knockout in the 12th round on November 4, 2006, after being knocked down twice.

On February 16, 2008, Liakhovich lost to Nikolai Valuev by unanimous decision following a one-sided contest.  He won his next two fights a first-round TKO of Jeremy Bates on November 7, 2009 in Nuremberg, Germany and a 9th-round KO of Evans Quinn in Mecklenburg-Vorpommern, Germany on May 22, 2010 on the undercard of Chagaev-Meehan.

On August 9, 2013, Liakhovich fought American heavyweight Deontay Wilder. Wilder won the fight with a first-round knockout.

In February 2014, Liakhovich achieved his first win in four years with a unanimous decision over journeyman Chad Davis.

Professional boxing record

References

External links

1976 births
Living people
Heavyweight boxers
Belarusian male boxers
World Boxing Organization champions
Boxers at the 1996 Summer Olympics
Olympic boxers of Belarus
Sportspeople from Vitebsk
World heavyweight boxing champions
AIBA World Boxing Championships medalists
Super-heavyweight boxers